Tilman Ridge is a ridge forming the northwestern arm of the Allan Hills, in Oates Land. Its northernmost point is called Stopes Point. The ridge and its constituent features were first reconnoitered and named by the New Zealand Antarctic Research Program (NZARP) Allan Hills Expedition of 1964. 

The ridge itself is named for W. H. Tilman, a mountaineering associate of Eric Shipton and N. E. Odell, after whom nearby Shipton Ridge and Odell Glacier are named. The point is named for Marie Stopes, authority on Carboniferous palaeobotany.

Townrow Peak is a prominent outlier of the Tilman Ridge, named after paleobotanist J. A. Townrow of the University of Tasmania.

It is named after a similarly shaped peak in the Hokonui Hills, New Zealand. Gadarene Ridge extends southward from it.

References 

Ridges of Oates Land